Tomlinson Fort may refer to:

Tomlinson Fort (congressman) (1787–1859), United States Representative from Georgia
Tomlinson Fort (mayor) (1839–1910), mayor of Chattanooga, Tennessee, 1876
Tomlinson Fort (judge) (1870–1930), Justice of the New Mexico Supreme Court 
Tomlinson Fort Jr. (1932–2012), professor of chemical engineering